Baoding Military Academy or Paoting Military Academy was a military academy based in Baoding, during the late Qing dynasty and early Republic of China, in the first two decades of the 20th century.  For a time, it was the most important military academy in China, and its cadets played prominent roles in the political and military history of the Republic of China. The Baoding Military Academy closed in 1923, but served as a model for the Whampoa Military Academy, which was founded in Guangzhou in 1924. It, along with the Yunnan Military Academy and the Whampoa Military Academy, was one of the “three major strategist cradles in modern China”. During the Second Sino-Japanese War, half of 300 divisions in China's armed forces were commanded by Whampoa graduates and one-third were Baoding cadets.

Predecessors
In 1885 Li Hongzhang founded the Tianjin Military Academy 天津武備學堂 for Chinese army officers, with German advisers, as part of his military reforms. The move was supported by Anhui Army commander Zhou Shengchuan. The academy was to serve Anhui Army and Green Standard Army officers. Various practical military, mathematic and science subjects were taught at the academy. The instructors were German officers. Another program was started at the academy for five years in 1887 to train teenagers as new army officers. Mathematics, practical and technical subjects, sciences, foreign languages, Chinese Classics and history were taught at the school. Exams were administered to students. The instruction for Tianjin Military Academy was copied at the Weihaiwei and Shanhaiguan military schools. The 'maritime defense fund' supplied the budget for the Tianjin Military Academy, which was shared with the Tianjin Naval Academy.

The Tianjin Military Academy in 1886 adopted as part of its curriculum the Romance of the Three Kingdoms. Among its alumni were Wang Yingkai and Duan Qirui. Among its staff was Yinchang.

History
In 1902, Yuan Shikai, the Viceroy of Zhili Province and the Minister of Beiyang, founded an officer academy in Baoding, the capital of Zhili Province.  Baoding was the headquarters for his New Army, which until 1901 was based in Xiaozhan, near Tianjin.  The Boxer Protocol required the Qing government to demilitarize Tianjin and the New Army was relocated to Baoding.  From 1902 to 1912, the officer academy in Baoding took on a number of different names, including the Beiyang Army Expedited Martial Studies Academy.  The academy trained officers for the New Army, which was a significant factor in Yuan Shikai's rise to power at the end of the Qing dynasty and the pivotal role he played in the Xinhai Revolution.  In 1912, after Yuan became the provisional president of the Republic of China, the academy was briefly moved to Beijing and became the Army Academy.  In October 1912, the academy was relocated back to Baoding and formally became the Baoding Military Academy.

Prominent Graduates
 Generalissimo Chiang Kai-shek, who would later become president of the Republic of China
Zhang Qun
Bai Chongxi
Cai Tingkai
Huang Shaohong
Zhang Zhizhong
Xia Wei.

Successors
Republic of China Military Academy

Memorial
In 1993, a memorial and museum was built on the site of the academy in Baoding to commemorate the academy and the 11,000 cadets who studied there.  In 2006, the memorial became a national-level historical site.

References

 
Defunct military academies
Military history of China
Military academies of China
Major National Historical and Cultural Sites in Hebei